The following is a list of beaches in Sri Lanka, an island nation south of India in the Indian Ocean.

See also
Sri Lanka
List of beaches

References 

Sri Lanka
Beaches
Beaches